Qaleh-ye Aliabad (also Romanized as Qal‘eh-ye ‘Alīābād) is a village in Dasht-e Zarrin Rural District of the Central District of Kuhrang County, Chaharmahal and Bakhtiari province, Iran. At the 2006 census, its population was 991 in 209 households. The following census in 2011 counted 993 people in 258 households. The latest census in 2016 showed a population of 929 people in 246 households; it was the largest village in its rural district. The village is populated by Lurs.

References 

Kuhrang County

Populated places in Chaharmahal and Bakhtiari Province

Populated places in Kuhrang County

Luri settlements in Chaharmahal and Bakhtiari Province